Corneliu Cotogoi (born 23 June 2001) is a Moldovan footballer who plays as a midfielder for FC Petrocub Hîncești.

Club career
Cotogoi made his professional debut for Dacia Buiucani in the Moldovan National Division on 5 July 2020, starting against Zimbru Chișinău. The away match finished as a 1–0 win.

International career
Cotogoi made his international debut for Moldova on 31 March 2021 in a 2022 FIFA World Cup qualification match against Israel, which finished as a 4–1 home loss.

Career statistics

International

References

External links
 
 

2001 births
Living people
Footballers from Chișinău
Moldovan footballers
Moldova international footballers
Association football midfielders
Dacia Buiucani players
CS Petrocub Hîncești players
Moldovan Super Liga players